Bakugan: Defenders of the Core is a multi-console action-adventure game released in 2010. Despite its title, it is based on Bakugan: New Vestroia. It was released for the DS, Wii, PSP, PS3 and Xbox 360.

Bakugan: Defenders of the Core will bring gamers into a fast binding action adventure to save the Earth and New Vestroia from Zenoheld, Spectra, and their Vexos minions.

Plot 
The game follows a separate story arc from the anime, in which the Resistance must protect Earth from a furious assault by the Vexos who are slowly taking over in order to destroy all of the Resistance's havens and Drago who contains the Perfect Core that the Vexos are searching for.

Gameplay

Story Mode 
In Story Mode the player travels the world to collect Core Fragments while evading security drones. Bakugan are used to disarm laser traps and other security devices.

Battle Mode 
Battle Mode uses a fighting engine similar to Dragon Ball Z games  and ability cards that are used to make powerful attacks. Bakugan can be captured, of which twenty can be used in Battle Mode.

Reception 
The DS, PS3 and Xbox 360 versions of Defenders of the Core received "mixed" reviews according to Metacritic.  In Japan, Famitsu gave the DS version a score of three sevens and one six for a total of 27 out of 40.

The PlayStation Portable received positive reviews according to Game Rankings.

References 

2010 video games
Activision games
Bakugan
Sega video games
Xbox 360 games
PlayStation 3 games
PlayStation Portable games
Video games based on anime and manga
Wii games
Now Production games
Nintendo DS games
Video games developed in Japan